Annie Sanders (born 2007) is an American rock climber, sport climber, and boulderer. In 2021, she won gold in IFSC Climbing World Youth Championships in lead Youth B. At just 15 years old, she won the USA national title for both lead and bouldering.

Rankings

YETI Climbing National Championships

IFSC - Climbing Youth World Championships 
Youth

Notable ascents

Redpointed routes 

 Omaha Beach, Red River Gorge. Flashed.

 The Madness, Red River Gorge.

See also 
List of grade milestones in rock climbing
History of rock climbing
Rankings of most career IFSC gold medals
Janja Garnbret, leading female competition climber in history
Josune Bereziartu, leading female rock climber in history

References

External links 
 IFSC profile
 Instagram profile  
 USAC profile 

2007 births
Living people
Sportspeople from Fort Worth, Texas
American rock climbers
American female climbers